Stephen Chow (born 1962) is a Hong Kong actor, filmmaker, and producer.

Stephen Chow may also refer to:
Professor Stephen Chow Chun-kay, Chinese businessman
Stephen Chow (bishop) (born 1959), Roman Catholic priest for the Diocese of Hong Kong

See also 
 Stefen Chow